John S. Dunne, C.S.C. (December 3, 1929 – November 11, 2013) was an American priest and theologian of the Congregation of Holy Cross. He held the John A. O'Brien Professorship of Theology at the University of Notre Dame.

Youth and training
Fr. Dunne was born on December 3, 1929, to John Scribner and Dorothy (Vaughn) Dunne in Waco, Texas. The eldest of three children, his birth was followed by siblings Patrick and Carrin.  He attended St. Edward's Academy on the campus of St. Edward's University, Austin, Texas, from 1943 to 1945, and then moved to Holy Cross Minor Seminary at the University of Notre Dame for his senior year of high school. Fr. Dunne was received into the Congregation of Holy Cross on Aug. 15, 1946 and made his First Vows on Aug. 16, 1947. He studied philosophy at the University of Notre Dame, where he graduated in 1951. Fr. Dunne made his Final Profession of Vows on Aug. 16, 1951, and was ordained to the priesthood on Dec. 18, 1954, in Rome. He earned an S.T.L. in Sacred Doctrine in 1955 and an S.T.D. in 1958, both from the Pontifical Gregorian University in Rome, Italy.

Professor at University of Notre Dame
Returning to Notre Dame in 1957, over the course of 55 years of teaching, Father Dunne became one of its most popular, even beloved, professors. He taught more Notre Dame students than any other person in the University’s history.  He wrote some 20 influential works on theology and the spiritual life, including The City of the Gods, The Reasons of the Heart, A Search for God in Time and Memory and Way of All the Earth. His most recent work, Eternal Consciousness, received a first-place award from the Catholic Press Association.

Father Dunne did additional studies at Princeton University from 1960 to 1961, and also served as a chaplain at Our Lady of Princeton. He returned to Notre Dame to teach from 1961 to 1967. He taught at Moreau Seminary on the campus of Notre Dame from 1969 to 1970 and then again at Notre Dame from 1970 to 1972. Fr. Dunne was a visiting professor at Yale University from 1972 to 1973 before coming back to Notre Dame to teach from 1973 to 2013. He lectured at Oxford University during the 1976-1977 academic year.  He spent several sabbatical years at the Holy Cross Center, Berkeley, California, throughout his tenure at Notre Dame. He received several awards from the University of Notre Dame, including the 2013 Presidential Award, the Sheedy Award and the Danforth Foundation Harbison Award. In 1999, Fr. Dunne was named as one of the most influential spiritual writers of the 20th century.

Father Dunne, adopting René Girard's notion of "mimetic desire," conceived another path in what he termed the "heart's desire," that place deep within a person where God's will and a person's own will are one.

Reception

Graham Ward (theologian) states in Cities of God (2000, Routledge) that Dunne "is, without making reference to them, at one with the Death-of-God theologians, who were, at that time in the States, announcing their own programme of Christian atheism".
Ward, citing Dunne's The City of The Gods: A Study in Myth and Mortality, continues that

Selected works
  Eternal Consciousness. Notre Dame, IN: University of Notre Dame, 2012.
  The Circle Dance of Time, Notre Dame 2010
  Deep Rhythm and the Riddles of Eternal LIfe, Notre Dame 2008
  The Road of the Heart's Desire: An Essay on the Cycles of Story and Song, Notre Dame 2002.
  Reading the Gospel, Notre Dame 2000, 168 pp.
  The Mystic Road of Love, Notre Dame 1999, 178 pp.
  The Music of Time. Words and Music and Spiritual Friendship, Notre Dame 1997.

Further books by Dunne are listed at Goodreads

References

Further reading
  Article by Melinda Henneberger https://www.commonwealmagazine.org/what-heart-was-made-0
  Article by his brother, Patrick Dunne, in Notre Dame Magazine: http://magazine.nd.edu/news/17885-the-brothers-dunne/
  Article about his illness by Gus Zuehlke in Notre Dame Magazine: http://magazine.nd.edu/news/42650-i-feel-god-here-the-presence-of-john-dunne/ 
 Article by Jon Nilson http://www.ts.mu.edu/readers/content/pdf/48/48.1/48.1.4.pdf
 Article on the South Bend Tribune http://www.southbendtribune.com/news/local/article_5c369504-4bad-11e3-9864-0019bb30f31a.html

1929 births
2013 deaths
People from Waco, Texas
University of Notre Dame faculty
Congregation of Holy Cross
American Roman Catholic priests
American theologians
Death of God theologians
Writers from Indiana
Writers from Texas
Catholics from Texas